Glasgow Sheriff Court is a sheriff court in the Gorbals (Laurieston) area of Glasgow, within the sheriffdom of Glasgow and Strathkelvin. It is reputedly the busiest court in Europe.

History
The new court was commissioned to replace the Old Sheriff Court in Wilson Street. The new court is located at 1 Carlton Place in the Gorbals area of Glasgow, on the banks of the River Clyde and adjacent to Glasgow Central Mosque. It is a three-storey building of large cut stone construction and was formally opened by Queen Elizabeth II on 29 July 1986. In 2008, the roof of the building was fitted with 700 square metres of solar panels, with the capacity to create some 97 kW of power. The system cost £500,000 to install, has an expected life-span of forty years, and is predicted to cut £20,000 from the Court's electricity bill, whilst saving around forty tonnes of carbon dioxide per year.

Operations
The court deals with both criminal and civil cases. There are currently twenty-eight sheriffs in post at Glasgow Sheriff Court (five of whom are floating sheriffs). They sit alone in civil cases and are assisted by a jury of fifteen members selected from the electoral roll in some criminal cases (cases using solemn procedure only). The Sheriff Principal is Craig Turnbull, who replaced Sheriff Craig Scott in 2016.

References

External links

Court buildings in Scotland
Government buildings in Glasgow
Scottish Courts and Tribunals Service
Gorbals
Government buildings completed in 1986
1986 establishments in Scotland
Category B listed buildings in Glasgow